Carina Wenninger (born 6 February 1991) is an Austrian professional footballer who plays as a defender for Italian Serie A club AS Roma, on loan from German side FC Bayern Munich, and the Austria women's national team.

Career
Wenninger is a member of the Austrian national team. On 1 December 2020, she played her 100th match for Austria in a 1–0 win over Serbia in the UEFA Women's Euro 2022 qualifying.

On 22 June 2022, Wenninger joined AS Roma on loan.

International goals

Honours

Club

Bayern München
 Frauen-Bundesliga: Winner 2014–15, 2015–16, 2020–21
 DFB-Pokal: Winner 2012
 Bundesliga Cup: Winner 2011

Austria national team
 Cyprus Cup: Winner 2016

References

External links
 Profile at FC Bayern Munich 

1991 births
Living people
Austrian women's footballers
Expatriate women's footballers in Germany
FC Bayern Munich (women) players
A.S. Roma (women) players
Serie A (women's football) players
Austrian expatriate women's footballers
Austrian expatriate sportspeople in Germany
Expatriate women's footballers in Italy
Austrian expatriate sportspeople in Italy
Austria women's international footballers
Women's association football defenders
People from Graz-Umgebung District
Frauen-Bundesliga players
Footballers from Styria
FIFA Century Club
UEFA Women's Euro 2022 players
UEFA Women's Euro 2017 players